Origins: The Journey of Humankind is an American documentary television series that premiered on the National Geographic channel on March 6, 2017. Hosted by Jason Silva, with narration from Mark Monroe, the series uses re-enactments to showcase major inventions and events in the history of human evolution that have been responsible for our modernization. In the eight-part series, each episode is themed on one aspect of human civilization: fire, medicine, money, communication, war, shelter, exploration, and transportation. Jason Silva has mentioned the works of Marshall McLuhan to be instrumental in conceptualizing the show. Andrew Byrd, an academic expert in linguistics, assisted with the ancient languages spoken during the dramatization.

Episodes

See also
 Mankind: The Story of All of Us

References

External links
 Origins: The journey of Humankind on National Geographic

National Geographic (American TV channel) original programming
Documentary television series about architecture
Documentary television series about art
Documentary television series about industry
Documentary television series about technology